Myrciaria borinquena is a species of plant in the family Myrtaceae and is endemic to the forests of Puerto Rico. It is a small tree that produces round fruit around 25mm in diameter.

References

borinquena
Crops originating from the Americas
Tropical fruit
Flora of Central America
Endemic flora of Puerto Rico
Fruit trees
Berries
Flora without expected TNC conservation status